Leslie John Riggs (30 May 1935 – 29 December 2020) was an English former professional footballer. He made over 350 Football League appearances, his most successful spells being spent with Gillingham and Newport County.

Career
Although born in Portsmouth, Riggs came through the junior ranks with Gillingham and made his league debut in April 1954 at the age of just 18. He went on to make 152 appearances for the Kent club and was noted for his tough tackling and long throw-ins.

In 1958 Riggs moved to Newport County for a fee of £1,750, where he again racked up over 100 Football League appearances. In 1961 he was sold to Bury for £750 but could only manage 6 league starts at Gigg Lane due to injury before a move to Crewe Alexandra in 1963. Eighteen months later he returned to Gillingham, who were strengthening their side after promotion to Division Three, and made 18 further appearances for the Gills.

In October 1965 Riggs joined non-league Ramsgate as player-manager and later spent more than five years as manager of their near-neighbours Margate.

After leaving football in 1977 Riggs ran a guest house and later opened a sporting goods shop in Cliftonville which still bears his name.  He lived in Broadstairs in retirement.  He died on 29 December 2020, aged 85.

References

1935 births
2020 deaths
English footballers
English Football League players
Gillingham F.C. players
Bury F.C. players
Newport County A.F.C. players
Crewe Alexandra F.C. players
Footballers from Portsmouth
Margate F.C. managers
Ramsgate F.C. players
Association football midfielders
English football managers